Arthur Watson may refer to:

 Arthur Watson (Australian footballer) (1902–1983), Australian rules footballer
 Arthur Watson (cricketer, born 1835) (1835–1920), English cricketer and father of the next
 Arthur Watson (cricketer, born 1866) (1866–1955), English cricketer
 Arthur Watson (cricketer, born 1884) (1884–1952), English cricketer
 Arthur Watson (footballer, died 1931) (1870–1931), English footballer who played for Sheffield United
 Arthur Watson (footballer, died 1937) (1870–1937), English footballer for Notts County
 Arthur Watson (footballer, born 1913) (1913–1995), English football fullback who played for Lincoln City, Chesterfield and Hull City
 Arthur Watson (journalist) (1880–1969), British newspaper editor
 Arthur Watson (priest) (1864–1952), Archdeacon of Richmond
 Arthur Watson (umpire) (born 1940), Australian cricket umpire
 Arthur Christopher Watson (1927–2001), British civil servant
 Arthur K. Watson (1919–1974), president of IBM World Trade Corporation and United States Ambassador to France
 Arthur Kenelm Watson (1867–1947), English teacher and cricketer 
 Arthur Watson, director of the Baltimore City Zoo
 Art Watson (1884–1950), baseball player